Pimp Tight is the second solo studio album by American rapper MJG. The album was released on April 29, 2008, by Real Talk Entertainment.

Track listing

References

8Ball & MJG albums
2008 albums
Albums produced by Cozmo
Real Talk Entertainment albums
Albums produced by Big Hollis